United Future is a New Zealand political party.

United Future may also refer to:
 United Future Organization (UFO), a nu-jazz group
 United Future of Democracy, a Kosovo political party, see List of political parties in Kosovo#United Future of Democracy
 People Power Party (South Korea), a South Korean political party that was formerly named the United Future Party